Fire and Ice: The Daring Adventures of Cool Coyote is a platform game created by Graftgold for the Amiga and the Atari ST, released in 1992 by Renegade.

Master System and Game Gear versions were developed by Graftgold for Virgin Games. The CD32 version was enhanced to include detailed background scenery, 256 on-screen colors and several layers of parallax scrolling.

Gameplay

The player takes control of "Cool Coyote". The goal of each level is to find the exit door and unlock it. To do so, a key is required, which consists of several pieces. Monsters will drop pieces of the key when killed, which requires the player to find and kill the monsters in the level. Attacking a monster works by shooting projectiles at it - this causes no damage though, but only will freeze it for a short time after having received enough hits. The player then has to touch the frozen monster while it is frozen to kill it.

Development
Braybrook stated that a Mega Drive conversion was completed but not released. Likewise, a Game Gear version was also planned but not released.

Reception

Critics regarded the game as an exceptionally well-done platformer. For example, it was "game of the month" in the August 1992 issue of Amiga Mania magazine with a rating of 92%, received an "Amiga Action Super League Accolade" in the June 1992 issue of Amiga Action magazine with a rating of 91% and was awarded a "CU Screen Star" in the May 1992 issue of CU Amiga magazine with a rating of 90%.

Spanish magazine Super Juegos gave the Amiga CD32 version 90.

References

External links
Fire and Ice at Amiga Hall of Light
Fire and Ice at Atari Mania
CD32 version

1992 video games
Acorn Archimedes games
Amiga games
Amiga 1200 games
Atari ST games
Amiga CD32 games
Video games developed in the United Kingdom
DOS games
Master System games
Cancelled Game Gear games
Cancelled Sega Genesis games
Platform games
Fictional coyotes
Single-player video games
Graftgold games